Tina Garabedian (born June 13, 1997) is a retired Armenian-Canadian ice dancer. She and her partner Simon Proulx-Sénécal represented Armenia at the 2022 Winter Olympics.

Personal life 
Tina Garabedian was born on June 13, 1997, in Laval, Quebec, Canada. She is one of three daughters of Maral Dermeguerditchian and John Garabedian, both born in Lebanon. She attended L'École Arménienne Sourp Hagop up to grade 7 and then switched to Collège Gérald-Godin with a sports-study program to accommodate her skating schedule.  In 2021 she graduated from McGill University with distinction, winning the Laddie Millen Award for top marks. She holds dual Canadian and Armenian citizenship.

Career

Early years 
Garabedian began skating in 2002. She competed in singles until age 14 and then spent a year as a member of a synchronized skating team. She formed an ice dancing partnership with Alexandre Laliberté in 2012. Appearing on the junior level, the two placed 9th at the 2014 Canadian Championships and debuted internationally the following season, representing Armenia. After placing 7th at both of their 2014–15 ISU Junior Grand Prix assignments – in Ostrava, Czech Republic and Dresden, Germany – Garabedian/Laliberté were sent to the 2015 World Junior Championships in Tallinn. In Estonia, they were 18th in the short dance and qualified to the free dance, where they placed 15th, lifting them to 16th overall.

Partnership with Proulx-Sénécal 
In May 2015, Garabedian teamed up with Simon Proulx-Sénécal, with whom she began competing on the senior level. She stated, "My coaches wanted us to skate together when I first started dance, but he was already 21 and had to move up to senior, and I was not ready for that then."  Making their international debut, they placed sixth at the 2015 Ice Challenge, a 2015–16 ISU Challenger Series (CS) event held in October in Graz, Austria. In December, they won their first CS medal – bronze at the 2015 Golden Spin of Zagreb.

In January 2016, Garabedian/Proulx-Sénécal were one of twenty teams to qualify for the final segment at the European Championships in Bratislava, Slovakia, having ranked 20th in the short dance. They finished 18th overall after placing 18th in the free dance.

Programs

With Proulx-Sénécal

With Laliberté

Competitive highlights 
GP: Grand Prix; CS: Challenger Series; JGP: Junior Grand Prix

With Proulx-Sénécal

With Laliberté

References

External links 

 

1997 births
Living people
Armenian female ice dancers
Canadian female ice dancers
Canadian people of Armenian descent
Olympic figure skaters of Armenia
Figure skaters at the 2022 Winter Olympics
Sportspeople from Laval, Quebec